Computer Aid International is a not-for-profit organisation active in the field of Information and Communication Technologies for Development. A registered charity, Computer Aid was founded in 1997 to bridge the digital divide by providing refurbished PCs from the UK to educational and non-profit organisations in developing countries.

Computer Aid has provided over 267,000 refurbished computers to educational institutions and not-for-profit organisations in more than 110 countries.

Organization

Computer Aid International is a non-governmental organisation registered with the Charity Commission of England & Wales and is a not-for-profit social business.

Computer Aid has offices in London, South Africa and Kenya. At the Africa HQ in Nairobi, 

Computer Aid has a board of trustees that meet quarterly to provide strategic direction and fiduciary oversight.

Denis Goldberg was Computer Aid's Honorary Patron.

Strategy

Computer Aid offers a decommissioning service to UK companies, government departments and universities that are upgrading their computer systems – donated PCs are data-wiped, refurbished and tested. Non profit organisations in the developing world can apply for refurbished computers for educational projects. They also run their own projects, such as Digital Schools where computer labs are set up.

UK IT Donors
Computer Aid has partnered with Tier 1 to offer a secure service to UK companies and organisations replacing their hardware. The charity provides end-of-life IT asset management services, which include data removal, computer refurbishment, reuse, and recycling.

See also
Computer technology for developing areas
 Geekcorps
 Geeks Without Bounds
 NetCorps
 Random Hacks of Kindness
 United Nations Information Technology Service (UNITeS)

References

Further reading

External links
 Article on a Computer Aid project supporting blind and visually impaired children in Kenya
 Article on a Computer Aid project helping farmers to maximise crop harvests in times of drought

Charities based in London
Development charities based in the United Kingdom
Information technology charities
Information technology organisations based in the United Kingdom
Organisations based in the London Borough of Hackney
Organizations established in 1997